Roger Hamby (born July 2, 1943 in Ferguson, North Carolina) is a retired NASCAR Winston Cup Series driver and NASCAR team owner whose career spanned from 1977 to 1981. He was one of the runners-up for the 1978 NASCAR Rookie of the Year award and has employed fellow NASCAR drivers Mark Martin, Lake Speed, and Sterling Marlin as a NASCAR team owner during the late 1980s. Now owns “Hambys Muffler” in Wilkesboro.

Career
Hamby drove  in his NASCAR Winston Cup Series career. His average start was 24th place, and his average finish was 21st. He formally competed in 18,446 laps of NASCAR racing, earning a lifetime total of $118,823. Hamby's top-ten finishes came at the 1978 Volunteer 400 and the 1978 Capital City 400.

He was most successful at the Ontario Motor Speedway, with an average finish of 12th place, and least successful at the Pocono Raceway, where he averaged 30th. He performed best on short tracks. On tri-oval intermediate tracks he averaged 25th place. Before racing in the Winston Cup Series, Hamby competed in the NASCAR Dash Series. His final Dash Series race took place on February 15, 1980.

Most of Hamby's career was spent as a driver-owner in the No. 17 Chevrolet sponsored by King's Inn Daytona. One of his vehicles was involved in a major crash in the 1979 Gabriel 400 when Steve Pfeiffer (replacing Hamby during the race in the No. 17 Chevrolet Impala) injured some spectators after a routine green flag pit stop went awry. As Hamby started the vehicle and made the substitution during the middle of the race, he got credit for the finish, not Pfeiffer.

References

1943 births
Living people
NASCAR drivers
NASCAR team owners
People from Wilkes County, North Carolina
Racing drivers from North Carolina